Mitsubishi Caterpillar Forklifts, Inc. is a group of multinational companies that were formed under a joint venture between Mitsubishi Heavy Industries (MHI) and Caterpillar Inc. in order to manufacture and market trucks. The group manufactures and distributes Cat Lift Trucks, Mitsubishi Forklift Trucks and Jungheinrich warehouse products to the material handling industry.

History
The joint venture was formed on July 1, 1992 when MHI entered a joint venture with Caterpillar Inc.

The joint venture includes the following companies based on the geographic markets they serve:
 Americas: Mitsubishi Caterpillar Forklift America based in Houston, Texas, USA.
 Europe & Africa: Mitsubishi Caterpillar Forklift Europe based in Almere, Netherlands.
 Far East: Mitsubishi Caterpillar Forklift Asia based in Singapore.

The joint venture combined a variety of operational strengths to form a successful company. Mitsubishi's operational strengths include cost-effective manufacturing expertise, vast engineering resources and possession proprietary powertrain. Caterpillar Inc. provided marketing experience, worldwide dealer organization, brand recognition and effective product support.

Mitsubishi Caterpillar Forklift America

Mitsubishi Caterpillar Forklift America Inc. ("MCFA"), headquartered in Houston, Texas  is a manufacturer and distributor of material handling equipment and parts under the Mitsubishi Forklift Trucks, Cat Lift Trucks, and Jungheinrich brand names. MCFA also owns the rights to Towmotor brand name, and manufactures under it. MCFA is ISO 9001-2000 certified and has obtained compliance certification from the California Air Resources Board (CARB). MCFA provides a full line of forklifts with complete sales and product support through more than 400 dealer locations throughout the United States, Canada and Latin America.

MCFA is a subsidiary of Mitsubishi Heavy Industries and one of the worldwide MCF group of companies:

 MCFE (Mitsubishi Caterpillar Forklift Europe) based in Almere, Netherlands
 MLAP (Mitsubishi Logisnext Asia Pacific) based in Singapore

Each group, with the exception of MLAP, is responsible for design engineering, manufacturing and marketing the product lines and handling parts distribution in their respective regions.

History
MCFA was formed through a joint venture in 1992 between two major companies, Mitsubishi Heavy Industries, Ltd. (MHI) and Caterpillar Industrial Inc. (CII). Jungheinrich Forklifts joined this partnership on January 1, 2010 through a manufacturing and distribution agreement with MCFA.

Products
Internal Combustion Cushion Tire Lift Trucks
Internal Combustion Pneumatic Tire Lift Trucks
Electric Counterbalanced Forklifts
Electric Narrow Aisle Forklift Trucks
Electric and Manual Walkie Forklifts

Mitsubishi Caterpillar Forklift Europe

Mitsubishi Caterpillar Forklift Europe B.V. (MCFE) is a manufacturer and distributor of materials handling products under the brand names Mitsubishi Forklift Trucks and Cat Lift Trucks.

Serving customers in Europe (including Russia and the Commonwealth of Independent States – CIS), Africa and the Middle East, it is a subsidiary of Mitsubishi Heavy Industries Ltd (MHI) and Caterpillar Inc. whose other materials handling subsidiaries include:

 Mitsubishi Caterpillar Forklift America Inc.
 Mitsubishi Logisnext Asia Pacific Pte Ltd
 Mitsubishi Caterpillar Forklift (Shanghai) Co. Ltd

MCFE is based in Almere, the Netherlands, from which it supports a network of more than a hundred independently owned and operated dealers and distributors covering more than 72 countries.
MCFE has received the following quality accreditations from the International Organization for Standardization:  ISO 9001, ISO 9002, ISO 14001

History
MCFE was formed in 1992 when MHI entered a joint venture with Caterpillar Inc.

Production and support facilities
MCFE’s headquarters are located at the ‘De Vaart’ industrial park in Almere, the Netherlands. They also own a separate manufacturing facility in Järvenpää, Finland, and can call on the resources of the Mitsubishi Caterpillar Forklift centres in Asia and America for further manufacturing capacity.

In addition, MCFE has a central European parts centre based in Puurs, Belgium. The European parts operation is supplemented and supported by those in Asia and America. 

In 2012 production in Almere stopped due to recession and lack of sales. MCFE changed from a production facility to a sales office.

References

External links
MCFA Official website
MCFE Official website
Mitsubishi Forklift Trucks Website
Cat Lift Trucks Website
Jungheinrich Warehouse Products Website
Mitsubishi Forklifts

Forklift truck manufacturers
Multinational joint-venture companies
Caterpillar Inc. subsidiaries
Mitsubishi Heavy Industries divisions and subsidiaries
Manufacturing companies established in 1992